Victoria State Emergency Service (VICSES) is a volunteer-based organisation responding to natural disasters and working to ensure the safety of communities around Victoria, Australia. Each State and territory of Australia has its own independent State Emergency Service (SES), and VICSES is only one of these services spread across Australia. At times of great need or catastrophic disaster, it is common that assistance be sought from other states.

VICSES is the lead agency when responding to floods, storms, landslides; tsunami and earthquakes as well as operating the largest network of road rescue units in Australia and one of the largest in the world.

VICSES also provides assistance to other emergency services such as Victoria Police, Ambulance Victoria, The Country Fire Authority (CFA) and to municipal councils in support of their emergency management plans.

There are more than 5,000 volunteers and 200 employees spread across 150 units that are committed and dedicated volunteers around the state who provide these services 24 hours a day, seven days a week and every day of the year in Victoria.

Responsibilities

Control Agency 

 Storm
 Flood
 Tsunami
 Earthquake
Landslide

Support agency 

 Country Fire Authority (CFA)
 Victoria Police (VICPOL)
 Fire Rescue Victoria (FRV) [Previously known as the Metropolitan Fire Brigade (MFB)]
 Ambulance Victoria (AV)
 Department of Environment, Land, Water and Planning (DELWP)

Activities 
In addition to its control agency functions, VICSES has a shared responsibility for rescues with the CFA and FRV.

VICSES along with other emergency services in Victoria, provide specialist response functions including:

 Road Rescue
 High Angle Rescue
 Industrial Rescue
 Urban Search and Rescue (USAR)
 Search and Rescue (SAR)
 Alpine Search and Rescue (ASAR)
 Land Based Swift Water Rescue (LBSWR)
 Marine Search and Rescue (MSAR)
 General Land Rescue

VICSES is also called upon to assist other agencies with unique tasks, some include:

 Victoria Police
 Crime scene preservation
 Evidence search
 General assistance (lighting, temporary power, ladders, etc.).
 Ambulance Victoria
 Assist with patient carryouts
 Assist paramedics in difficult terrain (4WD/ATV/BOAT)
 Country Fire Authority
 Staging area management
 Incident Management
 Environmental Protection Authority
 Deployment of air quality monitoring equipment

Regions 
VICSES is broken into 6 regions that cover the state of Victoria

 Central Region (Melbourne Metropolitan)
 East Region (Gippsland)
 Mid West Region (Grampians)
 North East Region (Hume)
 North West Region (Loddon Malle)
 South West Region (Barwon South West)

Ranks

Volunteer Insignia

Staff Insignia

Vehicles, Trailers & Other Assets

Cars

Passenger Vehicles 
Cars include a mixture of Ford, Holden, Subaru and Toyota

Mini-Van

Four Wheel Drives 
Mixture of Nissan Patrol, Navara, Pathfinder, Ford Rangers, Everest & Toyota Hilux

Light Rescue 
Mixture of chassis Ford, Mercedes & Iveco

Medium Rescue

Medium Rescue (2WD) 

Equipment Body:

 5 large and 3 smaller lockers, with 3 x shadow boards for the storage of tools, 5 x sliding shelves and,
 4 x slide and tilt shelves (including LED locker lighting).
 Light mast (up to 7.5m from ground) with 4 x 100W 24V LED lights (output 10,479 Lm per light).
 External work lights at the mid point of the body, controlled by the Hazard SLIC panel.
 Martin power supply system capacity of 8 kVA with 8 x 10A GPO’s.
 Compressed air system delivering 10 Cubic Feet per Minute (CFM) at 116psi.
 Bulbar fitted with HID driving lights.
 No tow bar fitted.

Equipment Capabilities:

 Up to 1,000kg of tools and equipment
 Multi purpose truck, i.e. capacity for storm and flood or RCR equipment.

Licence Requirements:

 Light Rigid Licence

Medium Rescue (4WD) 

Equipment Body:

 5 large and 3 smaller lockers, with 3 x shadow boards for the storage of tools, 5 x sliding shelves and,
 4 x slide and tilt shelves (including LED locker lighting).
 Light mast (up to 7.5m from ground) with 4 x 24V LED lights.
 External work lights at the mid point of the body, controlled by the Hazard SLIC panel.
 Martin power supply system - capacity of 8 kVA with 8 x 10A GPO’s.
 Compressed air system delivering 10 Cubic Feet per Minute (CFM) at 116psi.
 Bulbar fitted with 15,000lb, 24v winch & HID driving lights
 No tow bar fitted.

Equipment Capabilities:

 Up to 1,000kg of tools and equipment
 Multi purpose truck, i.e. capacity for RAIR, Storm and Flood equipment.

Licence Requirements:

 Light Rigid Licence

Heavy Rescue

Heavy Rescue Truck (2WD) 

Equipment Body:

 7 large and 1 smaller lockers, with 3 x shadow boards for the storage of tools, 5 x sliding shelves and
 8 x fixed shelving, 4 x slide and tilt shelves (including locker lighting).
 Light mast (up to 7.5m from ground) with 4 x 24v LED lights.
 External work lights at the mid point of the body, controlled by the Hazard SLIC panel.
 Martin power supply of 8kVA with 8 x 10A GPO.
 Compressed air system delivering 15 cubic feet per minute (CFM) at 130psi.
 Bull bar fitted with HID driving lights
 No tow bar fitted

Equipment Capabilities:

 Up to 2,000kg of tools and equipment
 RAIR purpose truck, i.e. capacity RAIR and storm or flood equipment.

Licence Requirements:

 Medium Rigid Licence

Boats 
IRB's

Trailers

Lighting Towers 

Genie AL6-6000

 8.40 m extended mast height
 2.45 m long (drawbar retracted)
 Kubota D1403 diesel10.7 kW @1500rpm

AllightSykes URBAN MLLED200K-9AC-K

 9-meter mast design
 LED's 4 x 500 watt
 200,000 lumens
 Kubota D905 Diesel Engine
 100km/h Wind Speed Rated

Sand Bag Trainer

Storm Trailer

Pump Trailer

Units

Central Region ( Including North West Metro and South)

East Region

Mid West Region

North East Region

North West Region

South West Region

Volunteers Association 

Volunteers and Units are represented by the Victoria State Emergency Service Volunteers Association (VICSESVA) which was formed in 1983.

The Association's role is to advocate for VICSES volunteers by raising issues that impact on skills, training, funding, equipment, ethics & safety. VICSESVA is a non-profit association run and managed by VICSES Volunteers.

See also
Australasian Fire and Emergency Service Authorities Council
Other States:

 (NSW) New South Wales State Emergency Service
 (QLD) Queensland State Emergency Service
 (SA) South Australian State Emergency Service
 (ACT) Australian Capital Territory State Emergency Service
 (WA) State Emergency Service of Western Australia
 (NT) Northern Territory Emergency Service
 (TAS) Tasmania State Emergency Service

References

External links 

 Victoria SES Facebook page
 Australian Council of State Emergency Services
 Victoria State Emergency Service
Victoria State Emergency Service Volunteers Association

Non-profit organisations based in Victoria (Australia)
Emergency services in Victoria (Australia)
Emergency management in Australia